USS Levi Woodbury may refer to:

 , was a Revenue Cutter launched on 27 March 1837 and sold on 1 June 1847. She was often referred to as Woodbury in US Navy records.
  was a steam-powered Revenue Cutter built in 1863 and 1864 and launched as Mahoning. She was renamed Levi Woodbury on 5 June 1873, and sold on 10 August 1915. Again, she was often referred to as Woodbury in US Navy records.

United States Navy ship names